Prvi partizan (abbr. PPU) is a Serbian manufacturer of ammunition and handloading components, based in Užice, Serbia.

The company produces ammunition for civilian and military consumers in a variety of calibers in various loadings. Several ammunition articles list Prvi partizan as one of the few sources of certain unusual cartridges, such as the 8x56mmR used in the M95/30 variant of the Mannlicher M1895, the 7.92×33mm Kurz cartridge used in the StG 44 rifle, and the 7.65×53mm Argentine cartridge. In early 2009, the company began manufacturing 8mm Lebel ammunition, becoming the first commercial manufacturer in decades to produce it.

Headstamp
Prvi partizan cartridges carry the headstamp "ППУ" ("PPU"), which stands as abbreviation of the company's name in Cyrillic letters, "Први партизан Ужице" ("Prvi partizan Užice"). Prvi Partizan has made ammunition with the headstamps PP and PPU.

History
The company was founded in 1928 under the name FOMU - Fabrika Oružja i Municije Užice ("Weapons and Munitions Factory in Užice).

During World War II the decentralized Resistance-run ammunition works run by Tito's partisans was named Prvi Partizan fabrika ("First Partisan factory"). This name was retained after the war when it was moved back to the FOMU facility in Užice.

According to the global trade data company Panjiva, Prvi partizan is listed as the third biggest foreign ammunition supplier in the United States market for 2016. The Government of Serbia invested 4 million euros for the new hall construction in 2017.

Production

Handgun cartridges

Rifle cartridges

Incidents
On 4 September 2009, seven employees died and 15 others had minor injuries after four explosions occurred in the gunpowder area. The Government of Serbia later declared 5 September 2009 as the National Day of Sorrow for the victims.

See also
 Defense industry of Serbia

References

External links
 
 Official website USA

1928 establishments in Serbia
Ammunition manufacturers
Companies based in Užice
Defense companies of Serbia
Government-owned companies of Serbia
Manufacturing companies established in 1928
Serbian brands